Condair Group AG is a Swiss manufacturer of commercial and industrial humidification devices and systems. It has sales and service companies in 20 countries around the world and a network of sales partners covering more than 50 countries. It also operates logistics and production facilities in Europe, North America and China. Its head office, including its administrative and research and development departments, is located in Pfäffikon/Freienbach in the Swiss canton of Schwyz.

Products 
The Condair Group, known then as Defensor, began to develop and manufacture a rotary sprayer designed to disinfect cattle sheds (to fight foot-and-mouth disease) shortly after the Second World War.
Today, the Group produces a wide range of steam humidifiers, steam distribution systems, hybrid humidifiers, adiabatic humidifiers, evaporative coolers, measurement and control technologies and water treatment products.
Typical use cases for these include:
 In homes and offices to improve health, productivity and wellbeing by keeping rooms at the ideal humidity
 In healthcare environments to aid recovery and to increase performance
 In a variety of industrial environments, such as those within the printing and paper, textile, wood, automotive and pharmaceutical sectors, to increase productivity and quality
 In food storage environments such as fruit and vegetable warehouses and wine cellars
 In data centers as an efficient way of ensuring that servers are kept cool and/or at the correct humidity
 In cultural institutions (particularly museums and galleries) to protect sensitive paints on canvases and conserve valuable antiquities and musical instruments.

Company history 
The foundation of what would later become the Condair Group was laid in 1948, when Defensor developed its own rotary sprayers for disinfecting cattle sheds. Condair's development of electrode steam humidifiers in 1958 launched the company into the HVAC market (heating, ventilation and air conditioning). WMH (now Walter Meier AG, Schwerzenbach, listed in Zurich) took over Defensor AG and Condair AG in 1975, followed by the Canadian manufacturer of steam humidifiers, Nortec, including its American sales and distribution network, some years later in 1982. Defensor AG and Condair AG merged in 1995 to become Axair, covering the entire spectrum of humidification technologies. The brand names Condair and Defensor were retained. In 2001, WMH acquired Draabe Industrietechnik GmbH, a consumer-oriented company with a full service business model. Between 2011 and 2014, further acquisitions were made in Denmark (ML-System), England (JS Humidifiers), the Netherlands and Belgium (Geveke Technology Solutions). In 2014, all of the humidification companies owned by Walter Meier AG were transferred to the Condair Group. The former listed holding of independent small companies then became a private company, now headquartered in Switzerland.

Technologies and innovations 
Condair developed the first hybrid humidifier to use two adiabatic humidification methods in parallel, the Condair Dual, in 1997. Its combination of spray and evaporation technologies made the humidification process more hygienic and efficient than using either of the two methods in isolation.  In 2000, Condair developed the Condair Mk5, the first steam humidifier to use a patented scale management system to solve the physical problem of scale build-up in the steam cylinders. These systems negate the need for replaceable cylinders.

References

Manufacturing companies of Switzerland